Avelino Arredondo was an Uruguayan assassin of Basque origin.

Background

Arredondo was a strong supporter of a rival faction of the ruling Colorado Party government of Uruguayan president Juan Idiarte Borda.

An apparent attempt was made on the life of President Idiarte in April 1897. This was widely publicized, including in El Día, edited by José Batlle y Ordóñez, where Arredondo's name also mysteriously appeared in connection with this incident, although he was ostensibly unconnected with this attempt on Idiarte's life.

Assassination of Uruguayan President

On August 25, 1897 Arredondo assassinated Idiarte in the Uruguayan capital of Montevideo as he emerged from a church service. Claiming to have acted alone, he was convicted of the crime and imprisoned.

Arredondo's act of shooting Idiarte dead is hitherto the only instance of the assassination of a sitting President in the history of Uruguay.

Place in literature

Arredondo later featured in the writings of the Argentine writer Jorge Luis Borges, who was an acute observer of Uruguayan history and politics; the story Avelino Arredondo appears in Borges's The Book of Sand (1975).

See also

 Politics of Uruguay
 Assassination of Juan Idiarte Borda
 Colorado Party (Uruguay)

References

 :es:Juan Idiarte Borda
 

1897 murders in South America
Uruguayan assassins
Uruguayan people of Basque descent
People convicted of murder by Uruguay
Uruguayan people convicted of murder
Assassins of presidents
Assassins of heads of government